Events from the year 1971 in Michigan.

The Associated Press (AP) selected the top 10 news stories in Michigan as follows:
 Court-ordered busing in the Pontiac public schools (AP-1);
 An order by federal judge Stephen Roth finding that the Detroit public schools were segregated by law, triggering concerns that he might order cross-district busing as a remedy (AP-2);
 The Michigan Legislature's reducing the age of adulthood to 18 (AP-3);
 A Supreme Court decision banning public aid to parochial schools (AP-4);
 The Michigan Legislature's adoption of a 50% increase in the state income tax (AP-5);
 Gov. William Milliken's plan to change the source of education funding by cutting local property taxes and raising the state income tax (AP-6);
 The Michigan Legislature's reduction of penalties for drug possession (AP-7);
 The debate concerning the state's budget which totaled more than $2 billion (AP-8);
 An explosion on December 11 in a water tunnel being built under Lake Huron near Port Huron resulted when methane gas built up and caused the deaths of 21 workers (AP-9); and
 A court challenge to the constitutionality of the property tax as a mechanism for funding education (AP-10).

The AP also selected the state's top 10 sports stories as follows:
 The death of Detroit Lions wide receiver Chuck Hughes after collapsing on the field with a heart attack during a game;
 The retirement of Gordie Howe after 25 years with the Detroit Red Wings;
 The Lions' release of Alex Karras despite having two years remaining on his contract;
 Mickey Lolich winning 25 games and finishing second in voting for the Cy Young Award;
 The 1971 Michigan Wolverines football team compiling a perfect 11-0 record during the regular season;
 The 1970–71 Detroit Red Wings finishing in last place and the resignation of Ned Harkness as general manager;
 Michigan State University athletic director Biggie Munn suffering a heart attack the week before the Michigan–Michigan State football rivalry game;
 The resignation of Butch Van Breda Kolff as head coach of the Detroit Pistons and the hiring of Earl Lloyd as the first African-American coach in Detroit professional sports history;
 The 1971 Major League Baseball All-Star Game held at Tiger Stadium in Detroit and home runs in that game by Reggie Jackson, Harmon Killebrew, and Frank Robinson; and 
 Eric Allen who set an NCAA single-game rushing record as halfback for the 1971 Michigan State Spartans football team.

Office holders

State office holders
 Governor of Michigan: William Milliken (Republican)
 Lieutenant Governor of Michigan: James H. Brickley (Republican)
 Michigan Attorney General: Frank J. Kelley (Democrat)
 Michigan Secretary of State: Richard H. Austin (Democrat)
 Speaker of the Michigan House of Representatives: William A. Ryan (Democrat)
 Majority Leader of the Michigan Senate: Robert VanderLaan (Republican)
 Chief Justice, Michigan Supreme Court:

Mayors of major cities

 Mayor of Detroit: Roman Gribbs
 Mayor of Grand Rapids: Robert Boelens/Lyman S. Parks
 Mayor of Flint: Francis E. Limmer
 Mayor of Lansing: Gerald W. Graves
 Mayor of Dearborn: Orville L. Hubbard
 Mayor of Ann Arbor: Robert J. Harris (Democrat)
 Mayor of Saginaw: Warren C. Light/Paul H. Wendler

Federal office holders

 U.S. Senator from Michigan: Robert P. Griffin (Republican)
 U.S. Senator from Michigan: Philip Hart (Democrat) 
 House District 1: John Conyers (Democrat)
 House District 2: Marvin L. Esch (Republican)
 House District 3: Garry E. Brown (Republican)
 House District 4: J. Edward Hutchinson (Republican)
 House District 5: Gerald Ford (Republican)
 House District 6: Charles E. Chamberlain (Republican)
 House District 7: Donald W. Riegle Jr. (Republican)
 House District 8: R. James Harvey (Republican)
 House District 9: Guy Vander Jagt (Republican)
 House District 10: Elford Albin Cederberg (Republican)
 House District 11: Philip Ruppe (Republican)
 House District 12: James G. O'Hara (Democrat)
 House District 13: Charles Diggs (Democrat)
 House District 14: Lucien N. Nedzi (Democrat)
 House District 15: William D. Ford (Democrat)
 House District 16: John Dingell Jr. (Democrat)
 House District 17: Martha Griffiths (Democrat)
 House District 18: William Broomfield (Republican)
 House District 19: Jack H. McDonald (Republican)

Population

Sports

Baseball
 1971 Detroit Tigers season – Under manager Billy Martin, the Tigers compiled a 91–71 record and finished second in the American League East. The team's statistical leaders included Al Kaline with a .294 batting average, Norm Cash with 32 home runs and 91 RBIs, Mickey Lolich with 25 wins, and Fred Scherman with a 2.71 earned run average. Lolich finished second in voting for the Cy Young Award.
 1971 Michigan Wolverines baseball team - Under head coach Moby Benedict, the Wolverines compiled a 23–13–1 record and finished second in the Big Ten Conference.

American football

 1971 Detroit Lions season – The Lions, under head coach Joe Schmidt, compiled a 7–6–1 record and finished in second place in the NFL's Central Division. The team's statistical leaders included Greg Landry with 2,237 passing yards, Steve Owens with 1,035 rushing yards, Earl McCullouch with 552 receiving yards, and Errol Mann with 103 points scored.
 1971 Michigan Wolverines football team – Under head coach Bo Schembechler, the Wolverines compiled a perfect 11–0 record before losing to Stanford in the 1972 Rose Bowl. The Wolverines were ranked No. 6 in the final AP Poll. The team's statistical leaders included Tom Slade with 364 passing yards, Billy Taylor with 1,297 rushing yards and 78 points scored, and Glenn Doughty with 203 receiving yards. 
 1971 Michigan State Spartans football team – Under head coach Duffy Daugherty, the Spartans compiled a 6–5 record.

Basketball

 1970–71 Detroit Pistons season – Under head coach Butch Van Breda Kolff, the Pistons compiled a 45–37 record. The team's statistical leaders included Dave Bing with 2,213 points and 408 assists and Otto Moore with 700 rebounds.
 1970–71 Michigan Wolverines men's basketball team – Under head coach Johnny Orr, the Wolverines compiled a 19–7 record and finished second in the Big Ten Conference. The team's statistical leaders included Henry Wilmore with 650 points and Ken Brady with 267 rebounds.
 1970–71 Michigan State Spartans men's basketball team – Under head coach Gus Ganakas, the Spartans compiled a 10–14 record.
 1970–71 Detroit Titans men's basketball team – The Titans compiled a 14–12 record under head coach Jim Harding.

Ice hockey

 1970–71 Detroit Red Wings season – Under head coaches Ned Harkness and Doug Barkley, the Red Wings compiled a 22–45–11 record and finished seventh in the National Hockey League's East Division. Tom Webster led the team with 30 goals, 37 assists, and 67 points scored. The team's regular goaltenders were Roy Edwards and Jim Rutherford.
 1970–71 Michigan Tech Huskies men's ice hockey team – Under head coach John MacInnes, Michigan Tech compiled a 25–6–2 record.
 1970–71 Michigan Wolverines men's ice hockey season – Under head coach Al Renfrew, the Wolverines compiled a 9–21 record. 
 1970–71 Michigan State Spartans men's ice hockey team – Under head coach Amo Bessone, the Spartans compiled a 19–12 record.

Golf
 Buick Open – 
 Michigan Open –

Boat racing
 Port Huron to Mackinac Boat Race – 
 Spirit of Detroit race –
 APBA Gold Cup –

Other
 1971 NCAA Indoor Track and Field Championships – The fifth annual NCAA indoor championships were held at Cobo Arena in Detroit in March; Villanova won the team championship.
 Yankee 600 -

Music
Several songs performed by Michigan acts and/or recorded in Michigan ranked on the Billboard Year-End Hot 100 singles of 1971, including the following:
 "Just My Imagination (Running Away with Me)" by The Temptations (No. 9);
 "What's Going On" by Marvin Gaye (No. 21), recorded at Hitsville U.S.A. in Detroit;
 "If You Really Love Me" by Stevie Wonder (No. 48);
 "Spanish Harlem" by Aretha Franklin (No. 49);
 "Bridge Over Troubled Water by Aretha Franklin (No. 52);
 "Draggin' the Line" by Tommy James (No. 54);
 "Mercy Mercy Me (The Ecology)" by Marvin Gaye (No. 62), recorded at Hitsville U.S.A.; and
 "I Just Want to Celebrate" by Rare Earth (No. 66).

Albums released by Michigan acts and/or recorded in Michigan in 1971 included the following:

Chronology of events

January

February

March

April

May

June

July

August

September

October

November

December
 December 11 - An explosion in a water tunnel being built under Lake Huron near Port Huron resulted when methane gas built up and caused the deaths of 21 workers.

Births
 January 17 - Kid Rock, recording artist, in Detroit
 February 2 - Jase Bolger, 71st Speaker of the Michigan House of Representatives (2011-2014), in Grand Rapids
 August 23 - Gretchen Whitmer, 49th Governor of Michigan, in Lansing

Gallery of 1971 births

Deaths
 February 8, Harry Kelly, 39th Governor of Michigan (1943-1947), at age 75 in West Palm Beach, Florida

Gallery of 1971 deaths

See also
 History of Michigan
 History of Detroit

References